Kannan Karunai is a 1971 Indian Tamil-language Hindu mythological film directed by N. T. Rama Rao. He also stars, alongside K. R. Vijaya. The film was released on 16 June 1971.

Plot

Cast

Production 
Kannan Karunai was directed by N. T. Rama Rao. The dialogues were written by A. K. Velan. The film was also produced in Telugu as Rajasooyam.

Soundtrack 
The soundtrack was composed by S. V. Venkatraman, with lyrics written by Papanasam Sivan and Udumalai Narayana Kavi.

Release 
Kannan Karunai was released on 16 June 1971.

References

External links 
 

1970s Tamil-language films
Films directed by N. T. Rama Rao
Films scored by S. V. Venkatraman
Hindu mythological films